Panama is an unopened Réseau express métropolitain station in the city of Brossard, Quebec, Canada. It will be operated by CDPQ Infra and serves as a station on the South Shore branch of the REM.

It will replace the current Panama bus terminus and will function as a large transit hub for the cities of Longueuil and Brossard. This station will be equipped with a bus terminal as well as a 700-space parking lot. Travel time to downtown Montreal will be less than 10 minutes.

References

External links

Railway stations in Montérégie
Buildings and structures in Brossard
Transport in Brossard
Réseau express métropolitain railway stations
Railway stations scheduled to open in 2023